Cao Lei (born 24 December 1983 in Qinhuangdao, Hebei) is a Chinese weightlifter. She was born in north China's Hebei Province and was raised in northeastern Heilongjiang Province.

Career
Cao Lei started weightlifting training at the age of 11 and attended Daging City sports school in 1997 when she was selected to the Heilongjiang province weightlifting team coached by Qixi Fu.

Lei made her debut in the international field in 2001 after winning the national championships in Asian Championships 63 kilo category by winning gold with a result of 107,5 kg (a junior world record at the time) in snatch, and 127,5 kg in clean and jerk, totaling 235 kg. The next year she started training with national team under the supervision of Ma Wenhui and she moved 69 kilo weight class in which she won the junior world championships 2003 with 105+140 kg performance.

In 2005 Cao placed fourth in the National games and later the year won gold in the East Asian Games. The next year she moved up one weight class and participated in the women's -75 kg at the 2006 World Weightlifting Championships and won the gold medal, snatching 118 kg and clean and jerking an additional 150 kg for a total of 268 kg. Later the same year, she took gold in the Asian Games, besting her year ranking mark to 120 kg in the snatch and 152 kg in the clean and jerk.

At the 2007 World Weightlifting Championships she won the gold medal again in the same category, with a total of 286 kg.

At the 2008 Beijing Olympic games, Cao won China's seventh weightlifting gold medal in the women's -75 kg weightlifting division. She lifted 128 kg (282.2 pounds) in the snatch and 154 kg (339.5 pounds) in the clean and jerk, giving her a total score of 282 kg (621.7 pounds). She set new Olympic records in the snatch and clean and jerk events, as well as setting a new overall score record. Cao attempted to break the total world record of 286 kg in her final jerk attempt by requesting 159 kg (350.5 pounds), but was unsuccessful.

At a news conference held after her win, Cao was overcome with emotion while speaking about her gold medal. She dedicated her win to the people of China as well as to her mother, who died two months earlier:

2009 she finished her weightlifting grand slam by taking gold in Chinese National Games with a result of 125 kg in the snatch, 150 kg in the clean and jerk adding to 275 kg total. In the 2009 weightlifting world championships she wasn't able to sustain her supremacy over the 75 kilo weight class as Svetlana Podobedova of Kazakhstan swept three gold medals, Cao following her to take silvers in all three disciplines. Later that year she represented her country in East Asian Games taking gold with routine performance of 252 kg total.

On 12 January 2017 it was announced that because of a doping violation she had been retroactively disqualified from the 2008 Olympic Games.

References

External links
 Athlete Biography at beijing2008
 Olympic Profile in Chinese
 
 
 

Living people
1983 births
Chinese female weightlifters
Olympic weightlifters of China
People from Qinhuangdao
Weightlifters at the 2008 Summer Olympics
Place of birth missing (living people)
Asian Games medalists in weightlifting
Weightlifters from Hebei
Weightlifters at the 2006 Asian Games
Weightlifters at the 2010 Asian Games
Asian Games gold medalists for China
Asian Games silver medalists for China
Doping cases in weightlifting
Chinese sportspeople in doping cases
Medalists at the 2006 Asian Games
Medalists at the 2010 Asian Games
Competitors stripped of Summer Olympics medals
World Weightlifting Championships medalists